Commander Oliver Young (11 July 1855 – 9 October 1908) was an English Royal Navy officer and later a British politician. He was the Conservative Member of Parliament (MP) for Wokingham from 1898 to 1901.

Early life and Navy
Young was born on 11 July 1855 at Wargrave in Berkshire, the son of Adolphus William Young a solicitor and later a Member of Parliament and his Australian wife Jane (née Throsby).
 He was educated at Burney's Naval Academy at Gosport and entered the Royal Navy in 1869.

By 1875 Young was promoted to sub-lieutenant and was a lieutenant by 1880. He served on  during the 1882 Bombardment of Alexandria and he was later on board  during the campaign in Sudan. In June 1887 Shaw retired from the Navy and married Mabell Ann Beale in 1888.

Politics
Young was elected to Parliament in a by-election following the death of Sir George Russell in 1898. He left Parliament when he resigned using the procedural device of becoming Steward of the Manor of Northstead on 3 July 1901. He died at his home at Hare Hatch in Berkshire on 9 October 1908.

References

External links 

 

1855 births
1908 deaths
Conservative Party (UK) MPs for English constituencies
UK MPs 1895–1900
UK MPs 1900–1906
Royal Navy officers
People from Wargrave
Royal Navy personnel of the Anglo-Egyptian War
People educated at Burney's Academy